"Cutting Off the Heart" is the eighteen episode of the first season of the South Korean anthology series KBS Drama Special. Starring Moon Jeong-hee and Im Ji-kyu, it aired on KBS2 on October 9, 2010.

Synopsis

Cast
Moon Jeong-hee as Yoon Sun-young
Im Ji-kyu as Lee Jae-woo
Sa Mi-ja as Yoon Sun-young's mother-in-law
Kim Na-woon as Lee Jae-woo's sister
Uhm Do-hyun as Woo-joo

References

External links 
 Cutting Off the Heart official KBS website 
 KBS Drama Special at KBS World
 

2010 South Korean television episodes